Franca Dall'Olio (born in Cagliari, the capital of Sardinia, on 5 April 1945) is a former beauty queen, model and politician.  She is noted for winning Miss Italia in 1963.

Many years after retiring from modeling, in the 90s she became a city counsellor in her hometown for two terms and served as chairman of the City Council Committee for Culture.  When in 1994 fellow Sardinian Alessandra Meloni won Miss Italia, too, Dall'Olio warmly congratulated her father in the City Council, making a notable bipartisan celebration for she was sitting in the far right and he was sitting in the left.

References

1945 births
Italian beauty pageant winners
Italian city councillors
Italian female models
People from Cagliari
Politicians of Sardinia
Living people
20th-century Italian women politicians
Sardinian women